Browns Bridge Church is a nondenominational Christian church located in Cumming, Georgia. It is one of eight locations of North Point Ministries. Andy Stanley is the senior pastor of North Point Ministries, and Adam Johnson is the lead pastor of Browns Bridge Church.

Browns Bridge Church opened on October 8, 2006 as the third satellite location of North Point Ministries.

North Point Ministries serves as the parent organization of North Point Community Church, Buckhead Church, Woodstock City Church, Gwinnett Church, Decatur City Church, and East Cobb Church. Several other autonomous churches are associated with North Point Ministries as strategic partners.

External links
 Browns Bridge Church Website

References 

Evangelical churches in Georgia (U.S. state)
Buildings and structures in Forsyth County, Georgia